On the Frontier of Space is a Canadian science documentary television miniseries which aired on CBC Television in 1959.

Premise
This series presents the 20th century development of outer space travel technology, and speculates on its future development. Footage was compiled from Canada, the Soviet Union and the United States. Interviews with experts such as Wernher Von Braun were included.

Scheduling
This series was broadcast on alternate Saturdays at 6:00 p.m. (Eastern) as follows. The American series Panic!/No Warning! was broadcast in other weeks.

Episodes
 21 March 1959: overview of launch vehicles such as rockets and missiles since World War II
 4 April 1959: describes the man-machine relationship of outer space travel
 18 April 1959: discusses the potential and pitfalls of space travel

External links
 

CBC Television original programming
1950s Canadian documentary television series
1959 Canadian television series debuts
1959 Canadian television series endings
Black-and-white Canadian television shows